Atelopus minutulus is a species of toad in the family Bufonidae.
It is endemic to Colombia.
Its natural habitats are subtropical or tropical moist montane forests and rivers.
It is threatened by habitat loss.

References

Sources

minutulus
Amphibians of Colombia
Amphibians described in 1988
Taxonomy articles created by Polbot